Bycanistes is a genus of medium to large, primarily frugivorous hornbills (family Bucerotidae) found in the forests and woodlands of Sub-Saharan Africa. They have often been included in the genus Ceratogymna, but today most authorities consider them separate. All species in this genus have black and white plumage. The plumage of the sexes is similar, but the casque of the male is larger than that of the female.

Recent genetic data shows that Bycanistes is the sister taxon to ground hornbills, this clade having diverged from the rest of the hornbill lineage early on. Bycanistes is thought to represent an early African lineage, while the remaining Bucerotiformes evolved in Asia.

Species

References

 Kemp, A. C. (2001). "Family Bucerotidae (Hornbills)". pp. 436–523 in: del Hoyo, J., Elliott, A., & Sargatal, J. eds. (2001). Handbook of the Birds of the World. Vol. 6. Mousebirds to Hornbills. Lynx Edicions, Barcelona. 

 

Bird genera
 
Taxa named by Jean Cabanis